Adrianus Dwiki Arya Poernomo (born 1 May 2000) is an Indonesian professional footballer who plays as a defensive midfielder for Liga 2 club Persela Lamongan.

Club career

Persija Jakarta
Dwiki Arya made his first-team debut on 7 November 2019 as a substitute in a match against Semen Padang at the Haji Agus Salim Stadium, Padang.

Persela Lamongan (loan)
He signed for Persela Lamongan on 5 Maret 2021 season, on loan from Persija Jakarta.

Career statistics

Club

Notes

References

External links
 Dwiki Arya at Soccerway

2000 births
Living people
Indonesian footballers
Association football midfielders
Persija Jakarta players
People from Semarang
Sportspeople from Central Java